Bob Garretson (born April 8, 1933) is a former American racing driver.

Garretson was the owner-driver of a Porsche 935 sports car team named Garretson Enterprises in the early 1980s that competed part-time in both the World Sportscar Championship and IMSA GT Championship. During 1978 he won the Sebring 12 hours. In 1981 along with veteran Brian Redman and Bobby Rahal Garretson won the 24 Hours of Daytona. Despite not winning another race that season, Garretson won the 1981 World Endurance Championship for Drivers title which was the first awarded. He sold the team and retired from racing shortly thereafter.

In 2019, he was elected to the FIA Hall of Fame for his accomplishment as part of the FIA Hall of Fame's sportscar wing.  WEC season-long champions are inducted into the FIA Hall.

References

External links
Bob Garretson at Driver Database

1933 births
American racing drivers
Living people
24 Hours of Daytona drivers
World Sportscar Championship drivers
12 Hours of Sebring drivers